There were 80 quota spots available for skateboarding at the 2020 Summer Olympics. Each NOC could obtain a maximum of 3 spots in each event (total 12 maximum across the 4 events). Each event had 20 athletes competing: 3 from the World Championships, 16 from world rankings, and 1 from the host, Japan. The full list of skaters qualified was announced on 9 June 2021.

Timeline

Qualification summary

Men's park

**Continental representation

Women's park

**Continental representation

Men's street

**Continental representation

Women's street

**Continental representation

References

Qualification for the 2020 Summer Olympics
Qualification